Princess Hermine of Waldeck and Pyrmont (29 September 1827 – 16 February 1910) was a German princess.  She was the second daughter of George II, Prince of Waldeck and Pyrmont and his wife Princess Emma of Anhalt-Bernburg-Schaumburg-Hoym. She was an aunt of the Dutch Queen Emma.

Marriage and issue 
On 25 October 1844 at Arolsen, she married her first cousin, Adolf I, Prince of Schaumburg-Lippe. His mother was a sister of her father. They had eight children:

Princess Hermine of Schaumburg-Lippe (1845–1930); married Duke Maximilian of Württemberg, only son of Duke Paul Wilhelm of Württemberg.
Prince Georg of Schaumburg-Lippe (1846–1911); succeeded his father as Prince of Schaumburg-Lippe; married Princess Marie Anne of Saxe-Altenburg.
Prince Hermann of Schaumburg-Lippe (1848–1928).
Princess Emma of Schaumburg-Lippe (1850–1855).
Princess Ida of Schaumburg-Lippe (1852–1891); married Heinrich XXII, Prince Reuss of Greiz.
Prince Otto Heinrich of Schaumburg-Lippe (1854–1935); married Anna von Köppen, Countess von Hagenburg.
Prince Adolf of Schaumburg-Lippe (1859–1917); married Princess Viktoria of Prussia, daughter of Frederick III, German Emperor and Victoria, Princess Royal, eldest daughter of Queen Victoria.
Princess Emma of Schaumburg-Lippe (1865–1868).

Two of their daughters were named Emma; both died young.

Ancestry

House of Waldeck
Princesses of Schaumburg-Lippe
1827 births
1910 deaths
19th-century German people
Daughters of monarchs